Serene Koong is a Singaporean singer, songwriter and producer. She is a three time Global Chinese Golden Chart Award, three time Singapore Hit Awards， Singapore Star Awards winner， and Asian Academy Creative Awards National Winner.

Recognised for her emotive voice and writing hit songs, her featured works include 《幸福不难》, theme song for the MediaCorp Channel 8 drama series The Dream Makers, 《明知我爱你》，as well as 《当世界只剩下我一个人》which she performed at the Global Chinese Awards in Beijing.

Music career

2010 - 2012: Career Beginnings 
In May 2010, she released her debut Mandarin album, <<55:38:7>>, composed of 10 original compositions, which produced a few  top ten hits on radio music charts in Singapore and Malaysia, among which was her widely popular single 《明知我愛你》，which peaked at No.3 on YES 933 醉心龙虎榜. 。 That year, she was among the most nominated artistes at the Singapore Hit Awards, receiving 2 awards ("Most Popular Newcomer 最受欢迎新人奖" and "Meritorious Newcomer 优秀新人奖") and 4 nominations, including her song 《明知我愛你》 being nominated for "Best Local Composition 《最佳作曲》 along highly acclaimed artists like Tanya Chua.

Koong has filmed for 2 advertisements with F&N Beverages, one of which featured her original song "Lala". She is also involved in movie and drama theme song writing and production, with theme songs recorded for MediaCorp's New Beginnings (红白喜事) -《在我左右》and The Dream Makers (志在四方) – 《幸福不难》 as well as 《手中线》for the movie Love Cuts (割爱) starring Zoe Tay and veteran Hong Kong actor Kenny Ho (何家劲). In 2014, she was invited as the Mandarin lead singer for the theme song,网织同心 (Knit with One Heart), of the Singapore Chingay Parade 2014 which was presented at the parade with Lee Wei Song as music director.

She made her debut in March 2012 in Taiwan with the album《聲.體.輿言》, distributed by Warner Music Taiwan 聲.體.與言 | 華納線上音樂雜誌. In the same year, she played to a full house for her first solo concert as one of the featured in::music artistes at the Esplanade's Huayi Festival. Other acts included high-profile Taiwanese singer-songwriters Waa Wei and Summer Lei.

2013: Multi-Award Winning Single《幸福不难》and Stepping Up to the Role of Producer 
In 2013, she wrote, produced and performed the theme song , 《幸福不難》 (Happiness is Not Difficult) for the MediaCorp Channel 8, TV 50th Anniversary blockbuster drama series The Dream Makers. 《幸福不難》 became a huge hit when the series premiered and raised the profile of Koong as a rising female Singaporean music artiste, songwriter and producer to watch as the drama series also featured Tanya Chua's work (十万毫升泪水) as sub theme song.

That year, Koong was named "Top Downloaded Female Artist" by MeRadio at the Singapore Hit Awards （第十八屆新加坡金曲獎） for the song 《幸福不难》(for which the winning male artist was popular Taiwanese singer Alien Huang. The 18th Singapore Hit Awards was held at Suntec Convention Centre and was attended by regional artists such as Karen Mok and Will Pan. Koong was amongst the Singaporean artists who won awards that night including JJ Lin, Derrick Hoh, Koong and Olivia Ong.

The Dream Makers was one of the most popular drama series in 2014 with a total of 19 nominations at the Star Awards and featured a star-studded cast which included Zoe Tay, Rui En, Jeanette Aw, Chen Liping, Rebecca Lim, Chen Hanwei and Desmond Tan. It went on to become the biggest winner at Star Awards 2014 with a total of 9 awards, including “Best Drama Series”. Koong won “Best Theme Song” at the Star Awards.

In 2014,《幸福不难》was also named "Top Dedicated Hit Song" by UFM1003. The song reached No.1 on the Singapore iTunes Mandopop chart, holding its No. 1 spot as top releases for that period among Asia's top names as Stefanie Sun and Eason Chan.On the back of the song's popular reception, Koong received two Global Chinese Golden Chart awards ( 全球流行音乐金榜）including "Outstanding Artiste Award" (Singapore, UFM1003), for which previous winners include JJ Lin and Tanya Chua. She also received a nomination for "Best Theme Song" at the prestigious 19th Asian Television Awards.

2015 - 2018: Big Leap to Film 

In July 2015, it was announced that Koong had written, performed and produced the theme song 《心肝》 for Kelvin Tong's film (Grandma Positioning System) in the highly successful SG50 Anthology "7Letters", a film by seven acclaimed Singaporean film makers namely, Boo Junfeng, Eric Khoo, K Rajagopal, Jack Neo, Tan Pin Pin, Royston Tan and Kelvin Tong to commemorate Singapore's Golden Jubilee.  It was the first film to open at the revamped historic Capitol Theatre, and all tickets to the three-day screening were sold out on the same day tickets were released. "7 Letters" received great reviews and overwhelming response from audiences as well as a 4.5/5 rating in the Straits Times. Due to the overwhelming response for the film, a second series of screenings were made available at the National Museum of Singapore for 8–10 August, for which all tickets were once again fully redeemed. It was finally announced that "7Letters" would be theatreically release in Golden Village Cinemas from 20–26 August. In her interview with UWeekly, Koong has shared that《心肝》was inspired by the love story of Singapore's founding father Mr Lee Kuan Yew and his wife. It was also mentioned that this song talks about holding on to memories and treasuring people we love. It is one of her most intimate works to date and pays tribute to love and her country, Singapore. She is the producer, vocal producer, songwriter and performer of the song, which peaked at #6 on the iTunes Mandopop Charts (SG) during its week of release. In August, it was announced that this acclaimed SG50 anthology will make its international premiere at the 2015 Busan International Film Festival in South Korea. The film was also selected by the Singapore Film Commission as the official entry to the Oscars' Best Foreign Language Film category.

Her 2015 single "All Alone《当世界只剩下我一个人》Sub Theme Song which she wrote, performed and produced for 志在四方2 “The Dream Makers 2” premiered on 4 December 2015. The blockbuster series has featured works by outstanding Singaporean female singers; in addition to Koong's works 幸福不难 and 当世界只剩下我一个人，the drama also features works by Tanya Chua (十万毫升泪水）and Kit Chan who performed the theme song 终于 for "The Dream Makers 2".

In August 2016, Koong was among the three Singaporean artists whose works charted on the Global Chinese Golden Charts TOP 20 (first half of 2016). The TOP20 chart includes top artists from the region including Stefanie Sun, JJ Lin, Jay Chou and Amei.

On 7 May 2017, Koong received the "Outstanding Artist of The Year" (年度推崇大奖）presented by UFM100.3 award at the Global Chinese Golden Chart Awards (全球流行音乐金榜）which recognizes the best in Chinese Pop Music. The awards ceremony was held at Beijing’s LeSports Centre with an audience of 10,000 and was streamed live to a reported 3 million viewers. A total of 20 artistes from around the region performed at this ceremony. They include: MayDay, LION狮子合唱团，William Wei, PowerStation, Della Ding Dang, Yisa Yu, Angela Chang, Allen Su and Bii. Koong performed her winning work《当世界只剩下我一个人》。

In her interview with Toggle, it was mentioned that she set up her own music production company GoodGirlMusic in 2013 to handle all stages of music production on her own. Although there were responsibilities and stress that came with producing her own work, it has made her work more personal.

On 9 August 2018, Koong appeared on the prelude episode of SPOP Sing! (SPOP 听我唱！), a singing competition which sees the involvement of prominent Singaporean artists, songwriters and producers in the search for the next homegrown talent. Koong served the series as a mentor (歌唱导师) to the Top 20 contestants, while their performances were judged by well-known music veterans Billy Koh and Lee Shih Shiong. The grand finals of the competition was held at the Padang on 4 November 2018.

Asian Academy Creative Awards 
Koong was announced as the National Winner for "Best Theme Song / Title" at the prestigious Asian Academy Creative Awards on 30 September 2021, with her work "When It Leads Me Back To You", which she wrote, performed and produced for Mediacorp Channel 5's drama series "Slow Dancing".

Management 
Koong is independently managed by her own company GoodGirlMusic Pte. Ltd. GoodGirlMusic was also announced as one of the music production companies selected under the inaugural MediaCorp–MDA joint call for proposal in 2013 to produce theme songs for MediaCorp drama series.

Discography

Other Writing credits

Awards and nominations

References

External links

Serene Koong's Blog
Serene Koong on Instagram
 GoodGirlMusic Pte. Ltd.

1988 births
Living people
21st-century Singaporean women singers
Singaporean singer-songwriters
Singaporean people of Chinese descent
Singaporean Mandopop singers
Mandopop singer-songwriters